Lee Chung-Hee (also Lee Chung-Hui, ; born April 25, 1981) is a South Korean former swimmer, who specialized in sprint freestyle events. He is a sixth-place finalist in the 50 m freestyle, when his nation South Korea hosted the 2002 Asian Games in Busan.

Lee qualified for two swimming events at the 2004 Summer Olympics in Athens, by eclipsing FINA B-standard entry times of 22.95 (50 m freestyle) and 51.84 (100 m freestyle) from the Dong-A Swimming Tournament in Seoul. In the 100 m freestyle, Lee challenged seven other swimmers on the third heat, including Olympic veteran Carl Probert of Fiji. He shared a second seed and forty-fifth place tie with Panama's Ismael Ortiz in 51.74. In his second event, 50 m freestyle, Lee placed thirty-fifth overall on the morning's preliminaries. Swimming in heat seven, he picked up a fourth spot by 0.15 of a second behind Serbia and Montenegro's Milorad Čavić in 23.05.

References

1981 births
Living people
South Korean male freestyle swimmers
Olympic swimmers of South Korea
Swimmers at the 2004 Summer Olympics
Swimmers at the 2002 Asian Games
Sportspeople from Gangwon Province, South Korea
Asian Games competitors for South Korea
21st-century South Korean people